Ray Rowan (born 1954) is a retired  British racing driver. He won the British Hill Climb Championship in 1989, driving a Roman-Hart.

Notes

British hillclimb drivers
1954 births
Living people